Golden City is a mixed-use complex located in the Yankin section of Yangon. Its master plan includes nine 33-story residential towers, a hotel, a business center and a shopping mall. As of 2020, the first two phases of the master plan—seven residential towers and a business center, have been completed. Work on phase 3, which includes a hotel, shopping mall and cinemas, and a residential tower, had not begun as of March 2020.

The complex's first four towers were tallest buildings in Myanmar from 2016 to 2019. The complex's second batch of towers (Towers 5–7), the same height as the first four, then also became the tallest buildings in the country from 2018 to 2019.

Notes

References

Buildings and structures in Yangon